Raymond Thomas "Ray" Connor (born 4 December 1954) is a former Australian politician. He was the Liberal member for Nerang in the Legislative Assembly of Queensland from 1989 to 2001.

Connor was born in Sydney, and was a businessman prior to his election. In 1992 he was appointed to the Coalition front bench as Shadow Minister for Business, Industry and Regional Development. Following the Coalition's 1995 election win, he became Minister for Public Works and Housing until 1997, when he left the ministry. Connor's seat was abolished in 2001 and he unsuccessfully contested the new seat of Mudgeeraba.

References

1954 births
Living people
Liberal Party of Australia members of the Parliament of Queensland
Members of the Queensland Legislative Assembly
21st-century Australian politicians